Paul Damian Norwood Dugdale (born 24 June 1967) is a British Circuit judge.

He was educated at Canford School and King's College London (LLB). He was called to the bar at Gray's Inn in 1990 and served as a Recorder from 2005 to 2011.

References

1967 births
Living people
People educated at Canford School
Alumni of King's College London